John Joseph Newcome (died 1938) was an independent Irish politician. He was a member of Seanad Éireann from April to August 1938. He was elected to the 2nd Seanad in April 1938 by the Administrative Panel. He lost his seat at the August 1938 Seanad election. He was a governor of the Mount Street Club, a charity that helped the unemployed.

References

Year of birth missing
1938 deaths
Members of the 2nd Seanad
Independent members of Seanad Éireann